Pati Patni Aur Woh is a 1978 Hindi movie produced and directed by B. R. Chopra. The film stars Sanjeev Kumar, Vidya Sinha, Ranjeeta Kaur, and in guest appearances Rishi Kapoor, Neetu Singh, Tina Munim and Parveen Babi.

The film was remade under the same name in 2019 starring Kartik Aaryan, Bhumi Pednekar and Ananya Pandey. The film was directed by Mudassar Aziz and produced by Bhushan Kumar.

Plot
The film starts off indicating the parallels of the story with that of Adam & Eve. Here, Adam is Ranjeet (Sanjeev Kumar), Eve is Sharda (Vidya Sinha) while the apple is Nirmala (Ranjeeta Kaur). Ranjeet is newly employed in a company, whose pay scales can be gauged from the fact that he goes to work on a bicycle. However, this bicycle itself brings him face-to-face with Sharda, when he bumps into her by accident. Sharda's bicycle gets badly damaged & Ranjeet drops her off. The same evening, Ranjeet goes to the wedding of his friend Harish whose bride happens to live in Sharda's colony . Sharda is also present at the ceremony. Sharda & Ranjeet's love blossoms from there & soon they get married.

In the course of a few years, Ranjeet is Sales Manager of the company and father of a son. Sharda & Ranjeet are still living in marital bliss. That is, until Nirmala, Ranjeet's new secretary, shows up. Ranjeet is inexplicably attracted to Nirmala. She is an honest girl who is trying to make two ends meet. She is much more beautiful compared to Sharda. But most of all, she knows nothing about Ranjeet's true intentions & his married life. Ranjeet is initially upset with his thoughts about her, but finally gives in.

He carefully plans his further steps. He pretends to be the helpless grieving husband of a cancer stricken wife, who won't live much longer. Nirmala feels sorry for him, thus making it easier for him to get close to her. Nobody, not Sharda, not even his closest friend, suspects a thing. One day, Ranjeet bluffs to Sharda that he will be late coming home as he has a meeting. He takes Nirmala out to dinner. Next day, Sharda finds Nirmala's handkerchief, with lipstick marks on it, in Ranjeet's pocket.

She immediately confronts Ranjeet, who makes up a story about a co-worker whose handkerchief he may have accidentally taken. Sharda reluctantly believes him. Ranjeet decides to take his next steps more carefully. Sharda too starts thinking that her fears were unfounded. Ranjeet makes even more interesting back up plans: He prepares two books of poetry, professing his love. The poems are the same in both, only one book contains Nirmala's name, and the other contains Sharda's.

Ranjeet courts Nirmala without Sharda's knowledge. The turning point comes when Sharda sees him in a hotel with Nirmala. She later asks him about his meeting, about which the clueless Ranjeet lies. Sharda's fears are confirmed. She starts spying on him & Nirmala, taking incriminating pictures. After sufficient evidence is obtained, she secretly meets Nirmala, posing as a journalist. Nirmala, who hasn't seen Ranjeet's "ailing wife" yet, thinks Sharda intends to blackmail her. But Sharda reassures her that she won't.

Nirmala spills all the beans, upon which Sharda reveals her true identity. Meanwhile, Ranjeet gets another promotion & rushes home happily to tell his wife about it. Sharda catches him unawares and lets him know that he is busted. Ranjeet does not know what has hit him. He turns round, only to see Nirmala behind him. Sharda tells him that she is leaving him & the divorce papers will be soon sent to him. Sharda & Nirmala console each other. Ranjeet calls upon his friend & lies that Nirmala has said some malicious lies to Sharda about him.

Ranjeet's friend sides with him & lies about Nirmala's character. Sharda exposes Ranjeet in front of him as well, with help of the evidence she has collected. Sharda tells Ranjeet to choose either her or Nirmala. Ranjeet quietly gives Nirmala some money & lies to her, in a last-ditch attempt at damage control. But honest Nirmala returns the money to Sharda, making things even worse for Ranjeet. Sharda prepares to walk out on Ranjeet, while Nirmala resigns and leaves Ranjeet as well. Sharda comes to visit Ranjeet one last time, when their innocent son asks what is happening.

Sharda decides to give Ranjeet another chance, if only for their son and soon life comes back on track. But soon another secretary (Parveen Babi) joins the office & Ranjeet tries to resort to his antics once more. Just by coincidence, Ranjeet's friend suddenly walks in & Ranjeet backs off, taking this as a warning.

Cast
Sanjeev Kumar as Ranjeet Chhadha
Vidya Sinha as Sharda Chhadha
Ranjeeta Kaur as Nirmala Deshpande
Asrani as Abdul Karim Durrani
Parveen Babi as Neeta (Guest appearance)
Nana Palsikar as Nirmala's Nanaji
Om Shivpuri as Sharda's Father
Rishi Kapoor as Singer (Cameo of song "Tere Naam Tere Naam")
Neetu Singh as Singer (Cameo of song "Tere Naam Tere Naam")

Soundtrack

Awards and nominations

|-
| rowspan="3"|1979
|Kamleshwar
|Filmfare Award for Best Screenplay
|
|-
| Sanjeev Kumar
| Filmfare Award for Best Actor
| 
|-
| Ranjeeta Kaur
| Filmfare Award for Best Supporting Actress
| 
|}

Remake
The remake of the film Released end of 2019. It is produced by Bhushan Kumar, Juno Chopra and Abhay Chopra with Rajiv Jha Kartik Aaryan, Bhumi Pednekar and Ananya Pandey as star cast. The film is directed by Mudassar Aziz and
the filming began in February  2019. The film released on 6 December 2019.

References

External links
 

1978 films
1970s Hindi-language films
Films directed by B. R. Chopra
Indian films with live action and animation
Films scored by Ravindra Jain
Indian romantic comedy films